Andula Won is a Czech comedy film directed by Miroslav Cikán, based on a novel by Olga Scheinpflugová. It was released in 1937.

Plot summary
Pavel Haken, a young wealthy factory owner, is a bachelor and his mother is looking for a suitable bride for him. But Pavel is not keen on getting married. He decides to spend his summer holiday in a secluded cabin in the middle of the woods, "alone" only with his mother, his servant Václav and his dog Ferda. However, fate (and Pavel's mother) causes that a summer camp of the women's tennis club (of which some of Pavel's admirers are members) is set up on his land not far from the cabin. When Pavel inds out, he wants to leave immediately, but then he meets Andula, the camp cook, and changes his plans. He falls in love with Andula and after the summer holidays he marries her. Little does he know that she has made a bet with the rich ladies from the club that she will win him for herself, which will win her 30,000 crowns from the club members. After returning from his honeymoon elsewhere in Europe, Pavel learns about the bet in a phone call from one of the disgraced former admirers. Pavel becomes angry with Andula over the bet and in a rage throws her out of the house. Andula leaves and returns to her father's apartment. She uses the money she won to start a perfume shop. Business is good and when Pavel's mother visits her after some time, she finds out that Andula has not only become a successful businesswoman, but also the mother of Pavel's twin sons. Pavel reconciles with Andula and takes her back to his home.

Cast
 Věra Ferbasová - Andula Mráčková
 Hugo Haas - Pavel Haken
 Růžena Šlemrová - Hakenová (Pavel's Mother)
 Václav Trégl - Václav (Servant)
 Saša Rašilov - Mráček (Andula's Father)
 Stanislav Neumann - Tonda Mráček (Andula's Brother)
 Milada Smolíková - Aunt Kristýnka
 Anna Steimarová - T.O.Z.K. Club Directress
 Fanda Mrázek - Tramp
 Gustav Hilmar - Richard Kalous
 Marie Grossová - Kalous' Wife
 Eva Prchlíková - Gisela Kalousová
 Vlasta Hrubá - Sylvie Símová
 Milada Gampeová - Sylvie's Mother
 Dagmar Vondrová - Sylvie's Friend

References

External links
 

1937 films
Czechoslovak comedy films
1937 comedy films
Films directed by Miroslav Cikán
Czechoslovak black-and-white films